Bernd Barleben (1 January 1940) is a former German cyclist. He won the silver medal in team pursuit at the 1960 Summer Olympics

References

1940 births
Living people
German male cyclists
German track cyclists
Olympic cyclists of the United Team of Germany
Cyclists at the 1960 Summer Olympics
Olympic silver medalists for the United Team of Germany
Olympic medalists in cycling
Cyclists from Berlin
Medalists at the 1960 Summer Olympics